Colin David Lamont (born 24 August 1953) is an Australian politician and was a member of the second Australian Capital Territory Legislative Assembly, elected to the multi-member single constituency Assembly for the Labor Party in 1992. Lamont was a senior minister in the Third Follett Ministry; and held the following titles: Deputy Chief Minister, Minister for Housing and Community Services, Minister for Urban Services, Minister for Industrial Relations, and Minister for Sport. He sought election to represent the multi-member electorate of Molonglo in the Assembly at the 1995 general election, however was unsuccessful at retaining his seat.

References

Deputy Chief Ministers of the Australian Capital Territory
Australian Labor Party members of the Australian Capital Territory Legislative Assembly
Members of the Australian Capital Territory Legislative Assembly
1953 births
Living people